Dunayka is a rural locality (a selo) and the administrative center of Dunaysky Rural Settlement, Grayvoronsky District, Belgorod Oblast, Russia. The population was 527 as of 2010. There are 13 streets.

Geography 
Dunayka is located 14 km northwest of Grayvoron (the district's administrative centre) by road. Moshchenoye is the nearest rural locality.

References 

Rural localities in Grayvoronsky District